HAL Aerospace Museum is India's first aerospace museum located at Hindustan Aeronautics Limited premises, in Bangalore. Established in 2001, the Museum is part of the HAL Heritage Centre and Aero Space Museum, and showcases the growth of the Indian aviation industry and HAL for six decades.
The museum houses displays of various aircraft and helicopters, Aircraft engine models, Flight simulators, a mock Air Traffic Control Tower and exhibit of Indian aviation history.
The Museum is maintained by HAL (one of Asia's largest Aerospace companies).

Gallery

See also
List of aerospace museums

References

External links 

 HAL Aerospace Museum at Hindustan Aeronautics Limited

Museums in Bangalore
Aerospace museums in India
Museums established in 2001
Aviation history of India
2001 establishments in Karnataka
Industry museums in India